The international Gaon Digital Chart is a chart that ranks the best-performing international songs in South Korea. The data is collected by the Korea Music Content Association. Below is a list of songs that topped the weekly and monthly charts, as according to the Gaon 국외 (Foreign) Digital Chart. The Digital Chart ranks songs according to their performance on the Gaon Download, Streaming, and BGM charts.

Weekly chart

Monthly chart

Year-end chart

References

Korea international
International 2014
2014 in South Korean music